Poinciana Place may refer to:
Poinciana, Florida, formerly known as Poinciana Place
Poinciana Plaza, a neighborhood in Key West